Typhinellus androyensis is a species of sea snail, a marine gastropod mollusk, in the family Muricidae, the murex snails or rock snails.

Distribution
This species occurs in the following locations:
 Gulf of Aden
 Madagascar

References

 Bozzetti, L. (2007). Quattro nuovi muricidi (Gastropoda: Hypsogastropoda: Muricidae: Muricopsinae, Coralliophilinae, Typhinae) dal Madagascar meridionale. Malacologia Mostra Mondiale. 19(57): 6-10.
 Houart, R, Buge, B. & Zuccon, D. (2021). A taxonomic update of the Typhinae (Gastropoda: Muricidae) with a review of New Caledonia species and the description of new species from New Caledonia, the South China Sea and Western Australia. Journal of Conchology. 44(2): 103–147.

External links
 Houart, R.; Gori, S. & Rosado, J. (2015). Description of new species of Favartia (Pygmaepterys) and Typhinellus (Muricidae: Muricopsinae and Typhinae) from Southern Oman. Novapex. 16 (4): 121-128

androyensis
Gastropods described in 2007